Abraham of Arbela (died  345) (also known as Abramius) was a bishop of Arbela (also Persian) in Assyria.

During the imprisonment of Bishop Ioannis of Arbela, he was appointed as his deputy by the local religious community. The church historian Sozomen (died  450) described in the second book of his Christian Church, among other things, the persecutions and tortures that took place in the Persian Empire under Shapur II (died 379). In paragraph 8 of chapter 8 he says: 

Among the names he had been able to retrieve, the name of Bishop Abraham of Arbela also appeared. 
He was tortured and later beheaded under Shapur II because he refused to worship the sun in Telman. The saint is venerated on February 5. 

He has two feast days – February 4 and 5, but January 31 in the Catholic Church.

References

External sources
Holweck, F. G. A Biographical Dictionary of the Saints. St. Louis, MO: B. Herder Book Co. 1924.
The Bénédictins of Ramsgate 'Ten Thousand Saints, Hagiographic Dictionary' Brepols, 1991. 
Kirschbaum, Engelbert (established). Published by Wolfgang Braunfels' Encyclopedia of Christian Iconography. First to eighth volume 'Rome / Freiburg / Basel / Vienna, Herder, 1990. 

Year of birth missing
345 deaths
4th-century Mesopotamian bishops
Mesopotamian saints
4th-century Christian martyrs